St Albans Football Club may refer to

St Albans Football Club (GFL), an Australian rules football club in the Geelong Football League
St Albans Football Club (WRFL), an Australian rules football club in the Western Region Football League
St Albans Spurs, an Australian rules football club in the Victorian Women's Football League
St Albans City F.C., an association football club in England